Network is a play by Lee Hall, adapted from the 1976 film of the same name which had an Academy Award–winning screenplay by Paddy Chayefsky and was directed by Sidney Lumet.

Production history 

The play premiered in the Lyttleton Theatre at the National Theatre in London on 13 November 2017 (following previews from 4 November) and ran until 24 March 2018. The production was directed by Ivo Van Hove and starred Bryan Cranston as Howard Beale.

The play features set and lighting design by Jan Versweyveld, video design by Tal Yarden, costume design by An D'Huys, music by Eric Sleichim and sound design by Tom Gibbons. It was produced in association with Patrick Myles, David Luff, Ros Povey and Lee Menzies and supported by Marcia Grand for the memory of Richard Grand.

The play also features a live onstage television studio and an onstage restaurant titled Foodwork, where audience members can enjoy a three-course meal while watching the play.

The production premiered on Broadway at the Belasco Theatre, with previews beginning on 10 November 2018 and officially opening on 6 December 2018. Originally, the production was scheduled to run for 18 weeks only to March 17, but extended multiple times before closing on 08 June 2019, the day before Cranston won the Tony. Originally, the transfer was scheduled to play the Cort Theatre, but following the early closure of Gettin' the Band Back Together, producers announced that the play would open at the Belasco Theatre. Cranston reprises the role of Howard Beale alongside Tatiana Maslany in her Broadway debut as Diana Christensen and Tony Goldwyn as Max Schumacher.

Plot 
The plot closely follows that of the 1976 film but uses stage devices and audio visual technology to immerse the audience as participants. The audience becomes part of the play both as diners and a studio audience. The distance between fact and fiction is reduced, mimicking the blurring of truth and fiction in contemporary news media.

Reception
The London production of the play received mostly rave reviews, singling out Cranston's performance.

Cast and characters

Awards and nominations

Original London production

Original Broadway production

References

External links 
 

English plays
Plays based on films
2017 plays
Plays by Lee Hall (playwright)
Plays set in New York City